See one of the following:
 List of rivers by length
 List of rivers by discharge
 List of drainage basins by area